Tambankulu Callies FC is a Swati football club based in Tambankulu in the Lubombo Region that currently competes in the Premier League of Eswatini.

History
The club has existed since at least the year 2000.

Domestic results
Key

References

External links
Soccerway profile
Global Sports Archive profile

Football clubs in Eswatini
Association football clubs established in 1980